Dirty Dreamer (or Sale Rêveur) is a French drama film directed by Jean-Marie Périer.

Plot
A young man, who lives in a vacant lot with a band of misfits, invents a love story with an elegant young woman.

Cast

 Jacques Dutronc : Jérôme
 Lea Massari : Joséphe
 Jean Bouise : Robert
 Maurice Bénichou : Taupin
 Marthe Villalonga : Madame Taupin
 Anémone : Colette
 Dominique Bernard : Monsieur Taupin
 Greg Germain : César
 Nathalie Périer : Anne
 Magali Clément : The Standardist
 Caroline Loeb : The Waiter

Accolades

References

External links

1978 films
1978 drama films
French drama films
1970s French-language films
1970s French films